Aspects of America: Pulitzer Edition is an album by the Oregon Symphony. The recording earned Carlos Kalmar and the orchestra a Grammy Award nomination for Best Orchestral Performance.

References

2020 albums
Oregon Symphony albums